This is a list of notable graduates of Hong Kong Polytechnic University or the former Hong Kong Polytechnic.

Politicians and Public Services

 Chan Kam Lam (1971) - former member (Kowloon East) of the Legislative Council of Hong Kong SAR
 Leung Chun Ying (1974, Higher Diploma in Surveying) - former Chief Executive of Hong Kong
 Li Qiang (2005, EMBA) - Premier of the State Council of the People's Republic of China
 Lam Tai-fai (1981, Higher Diploma in Textile Technology) -  former member of the Legislative Council of Hong Kong SAR for the Industrial Functional Constituency; currently Chairman of the Council of the Hong Kong Polytechnic University and Chairman of the Hong Kong Sports Institute

Education

 Kim Man Lui (2006, Ph.D. in Software Engineering) – Author, business, and professor at Hong Kong Polytechnic University

Community Leaders
 Rebecca Lee (1964, Certificate in Commercial Design) - explorer
 Ng Chun-ting, Elton (2000, Bachelor of Science in Physiotherapy; 2005, Master of Science in Sports Physiotherapy) - mountaineer; 2018, Ten Outstanding Young Persons of Hong Kong

Design and Performing Arts

 Vivienne Tam - fashion designer
 Wong Kar-wai - film director
 Gigi Leung - singer, songwriter and actor
 Raman Hui - film director and animator
 Paul Wong - composer, songwriter, singer and the lead guitarist of the band Beyond.
 Alice Mak - artist and cartoonist, mother of cartoon characters McMug and McDull
 Pinky Lai - designer of the original Porsche Boxster and Cayman
 Stella So – illustrator and comic artist
 Phoebus Ng – singer and actor; champion of King Maker II, member of Hong Kong Cantopop group P1X3L

Outstanding PolyU Alumni Award
 List of awardees

References

Hong Kong education-related lists